The Steglich esterification is a variation of an esterification with dicyclohexylcarbodiimide as a coupling reagent and 4-dimethylaminopyridine as a catalyst. The reaction was first described by Wolfgang Steglich in 1978. It is an adaptation of an older method for the formation of amides by means of DCC (dicyclohexylcarbodiimide) and 1-hydroxybenzotriazole (HOBT).
 

This reaction generally takes place at room temperature. A suitable solvent is dichloromethane. Because the reaction is mild, esters can be obtained that are inaccessible through other methods for instance esters of the sensitive 2,4-dihydroxybenzoic acid. A characteristic is the formal uptake of water generated in the reaction by DCC, forming the urea compound dicyclohexylurea (DCU).

Reaction mechanism 
The reaction mechanism is described as follows:

With amines, the reaction proceeds without problems to the corresponding amides because amines are more nucleophilic. If the esterification is slow, a side-reaction occurs, diminishing the final yield or complicating purification of the product. This side-reaction is a 1,3-rearrangement of the O-acyl intermediate to an N-acylurea which is unable to further react with the alcohol. DMAP suppresses this side reaction, acting as an acyl transfer-reagent in the following manner:

References

Further reading
 
 J. Otera: Esterification. 1. Auflage, Wiley-VCH, Weinheim, 2003,

External links
 Mechanism for the Steglich esterification

Name reactions
Esterification reactions